Tennis events were contested at the 1967 Summer Universiade in Tokyo, Japan.

Medal summary

Medal table

See also
 Tennis at the Summer Universiade

External links
World University Games Tennis on HickokSports.com

1967
Universiade
1967 Summer Universiade